Fort Dix, the common name for the Army Support Activity (ASA) located at Joint Base McGuire–Dix–Lakehurst, is a United States Army post. Fort Dix is under the jurisdiction of the Air Force Air Mobility Command. As of the 2020 U.S. census, Fort Dix census-designated place (CDP) had a total population of 7,716, of which 5,951 were in New Hanover Township, 1,765 were in Pemberton Township, and none were in Springfield Township (though portions of the CDP are included there).

Established in 1917, Fort Dix was in 2009 combined with adjoining U.S. Air Force and Navy facilities to become Joint Base McGuire-Dix-Lakehurst (JB MDL) in 2009. However, it remains commonly known as "Fort Dix", "ASA Dix", or "Dix".

During 2015 to 2016, Colonel Shelley Balderson was commander, making her the first female commander of Fort Dix in the base's century-long history.

Overview

Fort Dix was established on 16 July 1917, as Camp Dix, named in honor of Major General John Adams Dix, a veteran of the War of 1812 and the American Civil War, and a former United States Senator, Secretary of the Treasury, and Governor of New York. Camp Dix was home to the 153rd Depot Brigade. The role of World War I depot brigades was to receive recruits and draftees, then organize them and provide them with uniforms, equipment, and initial military training. Depot brigades also received soldiers returning home at the end of the war and carried out their mustering out and discharges.

Dix has a history of mobilizing, training, and demobilizing soldiers from as early as World War I through April 2015, when Forts Bliss and Hood in Texas assumed full responsibility for that mission. In 1978, the first female recruits entered basic training at Fort Dix. In 1991, Dix trained Kuwaiti civilians in basic military skills so they could take part in their country's liberation.

Dix ended its active Army training mission in 1991 due to Base Realignment and Closure Commission recommendations, which ended its command by a two-star general. Presently, it serves as a joint training site for all military components and all services.

In 2009, Fort Dix and the adjacent Air Force and Naval facilities were consolidated into a single secure facility, Joint Base McGuire-Dix-Lakehurst.  The supporting component is the United States Air Force, and base operations are executed by the 87th Air Base Wing, which provides installation management to all of JBMDL while both the Navy and Army retain command and control of their missions, personnel, equipment, and component-specific services. Neither the Navy nor the Army base is subordinate to the Joint Base; each is simply supported by the joint base in base operations such as utilities, child-care centers, gyms, and other services, but each one reports through its own service-specific command chain and has its own commander (the Navy a captain and the Army a colonel). The commanders of both Fort Dix and Lakehurst serve also as deputy joint base commanders.

Units assigned
305th Aerial Port Squadron 
 Marine Aircraft Group 49
 99th Readiness Division
 1st Brigade, Atlantic Training Division, 84th Training Command
 USCG Atlantic Strike Team
 United States Air Force Expeditionary Center
 Military Entrance Processing Station
 NCO Academy
 Navy Operational Support Center
 174th Infantry Brigade
 Fleet Logistics Squadron (VR-64)

History

See footnote

Construction began in June 1917. Camp Dix, as it was known at the time, was a training and staging ground for units during World War I. Though the camp was an embarkation camp for the New York Port of Embarkation, it did not fall under the direct control of that command, with the War Department retaining direct jurisdiction. The camp became a demobilization center after the war. Between the World Wars, Camp Dix was a reception, training, and discharge center for the Civilian Conservation Corps. Camp Dix became Fort Dix on 8 March 1939, and the installation became a permanent Army post. During and after World War II, the fort served the same purpose as in the First World War, serving as a training and staging ground during the war and a demobilization center after the war.

On 15 July 1947, Fort Dix became a basic-training center and the home of the 9th Infantry Division. In 1954, the 9th moved out and the 69th Infantry Division made the fort home until it was deactivated on 16 March 1956. During the Vietnam War, rapid expansion took place. A mock Vietnamese village was constructed, and soldiers received Vietnam-specific training before being deployed. Since Vietnam, Fort Dix has sent soldiers to Operation Desert Shield, Desert Storm, Bosnia, Afghanistan, and Iraq.

U.S. Coast Guard site
The Atlantic Strike Team (AST) of the U.S. Coast Guard is based at Fort Dix. As part of the Department of Homeland Security, the AST is responsible for responding to oil-pollution and hazardous-materials release incidents to protect public health and the environment.

Federal Correctional Institution
Fort Dix is also home to Fort Dix Federal Correctional Institution, the largest single federal prison. It is a low-security installation for male inmates located within the military installation. As of 19 November 2009, it housed 4,310 inmates, and a minimum-security satellite camp housed an additional 426.

Mission realignment
Knowing that Fort Dix was on a base closure list, the U.S. Air Force (USAF) attempted to save the U.S. Army post during 1987. The USAF moved the Security Police (SP) Air Base Ground Defense school from Camp Bullis, Texas, to Dix in fall 1987. Putting 50–100 SP trainees on a commercial flight from San Antonio, Texas, to Philadelphia, Pennsylvania, every few weeks was eventually realized to be not cost effective, so the school was later moved back to Camp Bullis.

Fort Dix was an early casualty of the first base realignment and closure process in the early 1990s, after having lost its traditional basic-training mission, but advocates attracted Army Reserve interest in keeping the  post as a training reservation. With the reserves, and millions of dollars for improvements, Fort Dix has grown again to employ 3,000. As many as 15,000 troops train there on weekends, and the post has been a major mobilization point for reserve and National Guard troops since the September 11 attacks on New York City and Washington, DC.

Fort Dix has completed its realignment from an individual training center to a FORSCOM Power Projection Platform for the Northeastern United States under the command and control of the Army's Installation Management Command. Primary missions include training and providing regional base operations support to on-post and off-post active component and U.S. Army Reserve units, soldiers, families, and retirees. Fort Dix supported more than 1.1 million man-days of training in 1998. More than 13,500 persons, on average, live or work within the garrison and its tenant organizations. Devens Reserve Force Training Area in Massachusetts is a subinstallation of the ASA.

2005 realignments

In 2005, the US Department of Defense announced that Fort Dix would be affected by a base realignment and closure. For base operations support, it became part of Joint Base McGuire-Dix-Lakehurst, N.J. It was the first base of its kind in the United States and is the Department of Defense's only three-service joint base.  ASA, Fort Dix occupies and supports all training across 31,000 of the joint base's 42,000 acres.

Attack plots

1970

In 1970, the Weather Underground planned to detonate a nail bomb at a noncommissioned officers' dance at the base to "bring the war home" and "give the United States and the rest of the world a sense that this country was going to be completely unlivable if the United States continued in Vietnam." The plot failed the morning of the dance, when a bomb under construction exploded at the group's Greenwich Village, New York City, townhouse, killing three members of the group.

2007

On 8 May 2007, six individuals, mostly ethnic Albanian Muslims, were arrested for plotting an attack against Fort Dix and the soldiers within. The men are believed to be Islamic radicals who may have been inspired by the ideologies of al-Qaeda. The men allegedly planned to storm the base with automatic weapons in an attempt to kill as many soldiers as possible. The men faced charges of conspiracy to kill U.S. soldiers.

1969 stockade riot
On 5 June 1969, 250 men imprisoned in the military stockade rioted. The prisoners called it a rebellion and cited grievances including "unsanitary conditions", overcrowding, starvation, beatings, being chained to chairs, forced confessions and participation in an unjust war. The Army initially called it a "disturbance" caused by a small number of "instigators" and "troublemakers", but soon charged 38 soldiers with riot and inciting to riot. The antiwar movement, which had been increasingly recognizing and supporting resistance to the war within the military, quickly moved to defend the rebels/rioters and those the Army singled out for punishment. Soon the slogan "Free the Fort Dix 38" was heard in antiwar speeches, written about in underground newspapers and leaflets, and demonstrations were planned. See Fort Dix 38 for more.

Ultimate Weapon monument
In 1957, during their leisure hours, Specialist 4 Steven Goodman, assisted by PFC Stuart Scherr, made a small clay model of a charging infantryman. Their tabletop model was spotted by a public-relations officer, who brought it to the attention of Deputy Post Commander Bruce Clarke, who suggested the construction of a larger statue to serve as a symbol of Fort Dix. Goodman and Scherr, who had studied industrial arts together in New York City and were classified by the Army as illustrators, undertook the project under the management of Sergeant Major Bill Wright. Operating on a limited budget, and using old railroad track, Bondo, and other available items, they created a 12-foot figure of a charging infantryman in full battle dress, representing no particular race or ethnicity.

By 1988, years of weather had taken a toll on the statue, and a restoration campaign raised over $100,000. Under the auspices of Goodman and the Fort Dix chapter of the Association of the United States Army, the statue was recast in bronze and its concrete base was replaced by black granite.

The statue stands 25 feet tall at the entrance to Infantry Park. Its inscription reads
This monument is dedicated to
the only indispensable instrument of war,
The American Soldier—

The Ultimate Weapon

"If they are not there,
you don't own it."
17 August 1990

Geography
According to the United States Census Bureau, Fort Dix had a total area of 10.389 square miles (26.909 km2), of which  0.127 square mile (0.329 km2) is covered by water (1.22%).

Climate 
The climate in this area is characterized by hot, humid summers and generally mild to cool winters.  According to the Köppen climate classification, Fort Dix has a humid subtropical climate, Cfa on climate maps.

Demographics

Census 2010

Census 2000
As of the 2000 United States Census 7,464 people, 843 households, and 714 families wereresiding in the census-designated place. The population density was 663.9 people per square mile (256.4/km2). The 1,106 housing units had an average density of 98.4 homes per square mile (38.0/km2). The racial makeup of the CDP was 58.4% White, 35.6% African American, 0.4% Native American, 1.3% Asian, 0.1% Pacific Islander, 2.5% from other races, and 1.7% from two or more races. Hispanics or Latinos of any race were 22.8% of the population.

Of the 843 households, 63.6% had children under 18 living with them, 75.2% were married couples living together, 6.8% had a female householder with no husband present, and 15.3% were not families. Of all households, 14.7% were made up of individuals, and none had someone living alone who was 65  or older. The average household size was 3.06, and the average family size was 3.39.

In the CDP, the age distribution was 13.6% under 18, 8.1% from 18 to 24, 62.1% from 25 to 44, 15.1% from 45 to 64, and 1.1% who were 65 or older. The median age was 34 years. For every 100 females, there were 491.0 males. For every 100 females 18 and over, there were 734.5 males.

The median income for a household in the CDP was $41,397, and for a family was $41,705. Males had a median income of $31,657 versus $22,024 for females. The per capita income for the CDP was $10,543. About 2.5% of families and 3.2% of the population were below the poverty line, including 3.2% of those under age 18 and none of those age 65 or over.

Transportation
New Jersey Route 68 links Fort Dix to U.S. Route 206 near the latter's interchanges with the New Jersey Turnpike, U.S. Route 130, and Interstate 295. New Jersey Transit provides service to and from Philadelphia on the 317 route.

Education
The U.S. Census Bureau lists "Joint Base McGuire-Dix-Lakehurst" in Burlington County as having its own school district. Students attend area school district public schools, as the Department of Defense Education Activity  does not operate any schools on that base. Students on McGuire and Dix may attend one of the following in their respective grade levels, with all siblings in a family taking the same choice: North Hanover Township School District (PK-6), Northern Burlington County Regional School District (7-12), and Pemberton Township School District (K-12).

The Pemberton district operates Fort Dix Elementary School, located on-post.

In prior years, Pemberton was the sole school district for Fort Dix. In 1988, 23% of the students in that district were from military families. In 1997, plans were made to shift the students, numbering around 700, to North Hanover schools. Pemberton school officials were against that move.

Pop-culture references
Fort Dix is the home base setting in Cinemaware's 1988 C64 and Nintendo video game Rocket Ranger; the game is based on an alternate World War II scenario, wherein the Nazis discover lunarium, which could allow them to win the war unless a young American scientist stops them.

Notable people
 Jay Berger (born 1966), a former professional tennis player, reached a highest world ranking of number seven.
 Bruce Hill (born 1964), is former wide receiver for the Tampa Bay Buccaneers.
 Jim Riggleman (born 1952) is a former professional baseball player and manager.
 Mel Brooks (born 1926) is an American actor, comedian, and filmmaker.
Franco Harris (1950-2022) was a National Football League Hall of Fame running back, born in Fort Dix.

See also
 List of United States Army installations
 The 1976 swine flu outbreak

References

External links

 Joint Base McGuire-Dix-Lakehurst official website
 ASA - Dix official website (U.S. Army Support Activity)
 Fort Dix Command Chaplain Section. Army Support Activity–Dix (ASA-Dix) official website
 IMCOM Atlantic Region official website (U.S. Army Installation Management Command)
 Details on the Ultimate Weapon monument from the Fort Dix website
 Global Security details of history, area, military units, etc.

1917 establishments in New Jersey
Civilian Conservation Corps camps
Civilian Conservation Corps in New Jersey
Dix
Military installations in New Jersey
Dix
New Hanover Township, New Jersey
Pemberton Township, New Jersey
Pine Barrens (New Jersey)
Populated places established in 1917
Springfield Township, Burlington County, New Jersey
Dix
Dix
Military installations established in 1917